Nuestro barrio is a Mexican telenovela produced for Telesistema Mexicano in 1965.

Cast 
Carmen Montejo
Julio Alemán
Guillermo Zetina
Jacqueline Andere

References

External links 

Mexican telenovelas
1965 telenovelas
Televisa telenovelas
Spanish-language telenovelas
1965 Mexican television series debuts
1965 Mexican television series endings